Melaka City Football Club, or simply known as the Melaka City FC, is a Malaysian professional football club based in Malacca City, Malacca. The team plays in the second tier of Malaysian football, the Malaysia M3 League. The club's home ground is the 1,000-seater Hang Tuah Stadium.

History
Melaka City FC filled the slot left by SAMB FC when the club withdrew from the M3 League season.

Players (2020)

Season by season record

Notes:   2020 Season cancelled due to the 2020 Coronavirus Pandemic, no promotion or league title was awarded although this is now subject to a possible legal challenge

Management team
 Team manager: Mohd Rashidi Othman Assistant team manager: Irfan Fairullizam Ishak Goalkeeping coach: Azmir Abdul Aziz Physio: Najmi Hashim Kitman: Suffien Mohd Sharif'

References

Malaysia M3 League
Football clubs in Malaysia